The light middleweight boxing competition at the 1980 Olympic Games in Moscow was held from 23 July to 2 August at the Olympiysky Sports Complex. 23 boxers from 23 nations competed.

Schedule

Results

Finals

Top half
{{#invoke:RoundN|N16
|widescore=yes|bold_winner=high|team-width=210
|3rdplace=no
|omit_blanks=yes
|skipmatch=1-8;
|RD1=Round of 32
|RD2=Round of 16
|RD3=Quarterfinals
|RD4=Semifinals
|manualboldmatch9=yes

||

Bottom half

References

Boxing at the 1980 Summer Olympics